Joy Evelyn Partridge (28 March 1899 – 27 April 1947) was an English cricketer who played as a right-handed batter and right-arm slow bowler. She appeared in four Test matches for England between 1934 and 1935. She played in the first four women's Test matches in history, with her best performance coming in the second innings of the second Test against Australia, when her 6/96 helped England to an Ashes-winning victory by 8 wickets. She played domestic cricket for Buckinghamshire.

References

External links
 
 
Photo of Joy Partridge in action in New Zealand

1899 births
1947 deaths
People from Worcestershire (before 1974)
England women Test cricketers
Buckinghamshire women cricketers